Joseph John O'Toole (born 20 July 1947) is a former Irish independent politician, who was a member of Seanad Éireann from 1987 to 2011.

He was born and brought up in Dingle, County Kerry, O'Toole was a teacher for ten years and then a school principal in County Dublin.  From 1990 to 2001, he was appointed General Secretary of the Irish National Teachers' Organisation (INTO), and from 2001 to 2003, he was President of the Irish Congress of Trade Unions (ICTU). He lives in Kilsallaghan, County Dublin.

He was first elected to the 18th Seanad in 1987 for the National University (NUI) constituency, and was re-elected by the same constituency at each subsequent election until he retired from politics at the 2011 Seanad election.

In the Seanad, he was a member of the Parliamentary Joint Finance Committee. His autobiography "Looking under stones: roots, family and a Dingle childhood", was published in 2003.

References

1947 births
Living people
Alumni of St Patrick's College, Dublin
Independent members of Seanad Éireann
Irish schoolteachers
Irish trade unionists
Members of the 18th Seanad
Members of the 19th Seanad
Members of the 20th Seanad
Members of the 21st Seanad
Members of the 22nd Seanad
Members of the 23rd Seanad
Politicians from County Kerry
Presidents of the Irish Congress of Trade Unions
Members of Seanad Éireann for the National University of Ireland
People from Dingle